Dontolobus is a genus of beetles in the family Carabidae.

Species 
Dontolobus contains the following nine species:

 Dontolobus aemiliae Facchini, 2012
 Dontolobus ivorensis Facchini, 2012
 Dontolobus labroexcisus Facchini, 2017
 Dontolobus mirei Basilewsky, 1970
 Dontolobus pallidus (Burgeon, 1937)
 Dontolobus schatlebeni (Basilewsky, 1942)
 Dontolobus setosanalis Basilewsky, 1970
 Dontolobus similis Facchini, 2017
 Dontolobus trinotatus Facchini, 2012

References

Lebiinae